Daniel Searle may refer to:

 Daniel C. Searle (1926–2007), American business executive and philanthropist
 Daniel Searle (governor), English tobacco planter and governor of Barbados, 1652–1660